Rempart Mountain is a mountain near Tamarin in Mauritius's western district of Rivière Noire.

Rempart Mountain is rarely visited because it is dangerous. It is in private hands. Hiking requires permission from Yemen or Casela or from Beau Songes although this is more dangerous. It is next to Trois Mamelles. Most Mauritians consider it as two mountains because Rempart is taller than Trois mamelles, representing a tall boy and short girl.

See also
Rivière du Rempart (river) in north-east Mauritius.

References

Rivière Noire District
Mountains of Mauritius